The southwestern toad or Mexican Madre toad (Anaxyrus mexicanus), formerly Bufo mexicanus, is a species of toad in the family Bufonidae. It is endemic to north-western Mexico and found on the Sierra Madre Occidental in eastern Sonora and western Chihuahua and south to south-western Durango.
Its natural habitats are conifer forests, commonly along low rivers and streams, its breeding habitat. It is a rare species threatened by habitat disturbance, including alterations causing the desiccation of streams and soils.

References

Anaxyrus
Endemic amphibians of Mexico
Fauna of the Sierra Madre Occidental
Amphibians described in 1879
Taxonomy articles created by Polbot